Mellah Slimane Bridge is a 125 m long suspension Footbridge across the Rhumel River in Constantine, Algeria. It was opened in April 1925 and until it was the 3rd highest bridge in the world at 110 m. The bridge was designed by Ferdinand Arnodin and links Larbi Ben M'hidi Larbi Street to Romania Road which means it connects the train station neighbourhood to the centre of the old town, this connection is via a staircase, or the Merdersa lift. It is located halfway between Sidi Rached bridge and Bab El Kantra Bridge. The bridge underwent restoration in 2000 when its cables were replaced by the Algerian company SAPTA.

See also

List of longest suspension bridge spans
List of bridges by length
List of highest bridges in the world
List of tallest bridges in the world
Salah Bey Viaduct
Sidi Rached Viaduct
Bab El Kantra Bridge
Sidi M'Cid Bridge

References 

Suspension bridges in Algeria
Bridges in Constantine, Algeria
Landmarks in Algeria
Buildings and structures in Constantine Province
Transport in Constantine, Algeria
Bridges in Algeria
Bridges completed in 1925
1925 establishments in Algeria